This is a list of Greek writers.

The Ionian writers
Andreas Kalvos 
Dionysios Solomos 
Gregorios Xenopoulos

The Romantic writers
Dimitrios Vikelas

The New Athenian writers
Christos Christovasilis
Kostas Karyotakis
Napoleon Lapathiotis
Kostis Palamas
Alexandros Papadiamantis
Angelos Sikelianos
Gregorios Xenopoulos

The 1930s
Penelope Delta
Nikos Kavadias
Nikos Kazantzakis
Giannis Skarimpas

The Surrealists
Nanos Valaoritis
Andreas Empeirikos
Nicolas Calas

Greek writers from 1944–1974
Aris Alexandrou
Manolis Anagnostakis
Odysseas Elytis
Nikos Karouzos
Melissanthi
Katina Papa
Giorgos Seferis
Yiannis Ritsos
Miltos Sachtouris
Takis Sinopoulos

Modern Greek writers
Sam Albatros
Auguste Corteau
Nikos Dimou
Maro Douka
Justine Frangouli-Argyris
Kostis Gimossoulis
Alexandros Giotis
Panos Karnezis
Dimitri Kitsikis
Yannis Kondos
Dimosthenis Kourtovik
George Leonardos
Dimitris Lyacos
Christoforos Liontakis
Aris Marangopoulos
Petros Markaris
Jenny Mastoraki
George Pol Papadakis
Lefteris Poulios
Vangelis Raptopoulos
Alexis Stamatis
Vassilis Steriadis
Stefanos Tassopoulos
Soti Triantafyllou
Sotiris Trivizas
Haris Vlavianos

Unsorted
Apostolos Doxiadis
Konstantinos Kavafis
Dean Kalymniou
Christos Tsiolkas
Yannis Xirotiris

See also
List of Greek women writers

 
Greek
Writers